Kalmer Tennosaar (23 November 1928, Kiidjärve, Vastse-Kuuste Parish – 20 September 2004, Tallinn) was an Estonian singer and Eesti Televisioon journalist.

He was popular in Soviet times as a soloist of the Popular Music Orchestra of the Estonian Radio and Television.

Kalmer Tennosaar began as a presenter at ETV on 1 January 1956, and subsequently worked as an editor and fellow of music programmes (1957–1962, and then after 1968). He became very popular as the host of a children's songs show "Entel-tentel". Tennosaar later continued his career as a singer.

Tennosaar was married to actress Sirje Arbi from 1964 until 1978. The couple had two daughters, including actress Liina Tennosaar.

References

External links

1928 births
2004 deaths
People from Põlva Parish
Estonian journalists
20th-century Estonian male singers
Estonian television personalities
Soviet television presenters
Burials at Rahumäe Cemetery
Recipients of the Order of the White Star, 4th Class
20th-century journalists